Jake Maizen (born 4 January 1997) is a Italy international rugby league footballer who plays as a  or er for the Halifax Panthers in the RFL Championship.

Background
Maizen is of Italian descent.

Playing career

Club career
Maizen previously played for the Central Queensland Capras in the Queensland Cup

He played in 6 games, and scored 4 tries for the Sunshine Coast Falcons in the 2022 Queensland Cup.

International career
In 2022 Maizen was named in the Italy squad for the 2021 Rugby League World Cup.
Maizen made his debut for Italy in the opening match of the 2021 Rugby League World Cup against Scotland scoring a hat-trick in Italy's 28–4 victory.

References

External links
Sunshine Coast Falcons profile
Italy profile

1997 births
Living people
Australian rugby league players
Australian expatriate sportspeople in England
Australian people of Italian descent
Central Queensland Capras players
Halifax R.L.F.C. players
Italy national rugby league team players
Italian expatriate sportspeople in England
Rugby league centres
Rugby league wingers
Sunshine Coast Falcons players